The 2014 Texas Longhorns softball team represented the University of Texas at Austin in the 2014 NCAA Division I softball season. Connie Clark entered the year as head coach of the Longhorns for an 18th consecutive season. The Longhorns were picked to finish third in the pre-season conference polls. After posting a 12-6 record in conference play, the Longhorns finished exactly where they were picked to finish and qualified for the NCAA softball tournament as an at large bid. The Longhorns would go 2-2 in the Lafayette Region and bow out with a final record of 35-23.

2014 Roster

Schedule 

|-
!colspan=10 style="background:#CC5500; color:#FFFFFF;"| Regular Season

|-
!colspan=10 style="background:#CC5500; color:#FFFFFF;"| Louisiana Classic

|-
!colspan=10 style="background:#CC5500; color:#FFFFFF;"| Regular Season

|-
!colspan=10 style="background:#CC5500; color:#FFFFFF;"| Texas Classic

|-
!colspan=10 style="background:#CC5500; color:#FFFFFF;"| Mary Nutter Classic

|-
!colspan=10 style="background:#CC5500; color:#FFFFFF;"| Texas Invitational

|-
!colspan=10 style="background:#CC5500; color:#FFFFFF;"| Judi Garman Classic

|-
!colspan=10 style="background:#CC5500; color:#FFFFFF;"| Regular Season

|-
!colspan=10 style="background:#CC5500;"| 2014 NCAA Regionals

TV, Radio, and Streaming Information 
More than 60% of the Texas schedule would air on television. Below are the announcing assignments for the games that were televised. If a TV station isn't listed, the game aired on Longhorn Network.
 LSU (CST): Lyn Rollins & Yvette Girourd
 UTSA: Carter Blackburn & Cat Osterman
 Texas Classic: Alex Loeb & Amanda Scarborough
 Texas Invitational: Alex Loeb & Amanda Scarborough
 Iowa (Game 1): Alex Loeb & Megan Willis
 Iowa (Game 2): Alex Loeb & Cat Osterman
 Iowa (Game 3): Carter Blackburn & Cat Osterman
 Houston: Carter Blackburn & Cat Osterman
 Baylor (Game 1) (FSSW): John Morris & Megan Turk
 Texas A&M-Corpus Christi: Carter Blackburn & Cat Osterman
 Texas State: Alex Loeb & Cat Osterman
 Texas Tech Series: Alex Loeb & Amanda Scarborough
 Oklahoma (Game 1) (ESPN2): Beth Mowins & Jessica Mendoza
 Oklahoma (Game 2) (FCS Central): Bruce Haertl, Jessica Shults, & Jessica Coody
 Oklahoma (Game 3) (FSN): Brenda VanLengen & Tracy Warren
 Oklahoma State (Games 1-2): Carter Blackburn & Amanda Scarborough
 Oklahoma State (Game 3): Carter Blackburn & Cat Osterman
 Kansas Series: Carter Blackburn & Megan Willis
 Baylor (Game 2) (FSSW+): John Morris & Megan Turk
 Baylor (Game 3): Carter Blackburn & Megan Willis
 Mississippi State (ESPN3): Melissa Lee & Kayla Braud
 Louisiana-Lafayette (ESPN3): Melissa Lee & Kayla Braud
 Mississippi State (ESPN3): Melissa Lee & Kayla Braud
 Louisiana-Lafayette (ESPN3): Melissa Lee & Kayla Braud

References 

Texas
Texas Longhorns softball seasons
Texas Longhorns softball